Hulata is a kibbutz in northern Israel. Located in the Hula Valley, it falls under the jurisdiction of Upper Galilee Regional Council.

History
The kibbutz was established in 1937 as a fishing village by a gar'in of HaMahanot HaOlim youth group members. It was named for its location in the Hula Valley. After the draining of the Hula swamps, the residents began working in agriculture.

The documentary film Kibbutz  traces the stages of grieving and disillusionment that followed Hulata's economic collapse and privatization.

Hulata is a pluralistic kibbutz that accepts members from all backgrounds, both religiously observant and not.

Gallery

Notable residents
Tal Russo
 Mike Schwartz (born 1949), American-Israeli basketball player and coach
Iftach Spector

References

Kibbutzim
Kibbutz Movement
Populated places established in 1937
1937 establishments in Mandatory Palestine
Populated places in Northern District (Israel)